Nimrod Megiddo is a mathematician and computer scientist. He is a research scientist at the IBM Almaden Research Center and Stanford University. His interests include combinatorial optimization, algorithm design and analysis, game theory, and machine learning. He was one of the first people to propose a solution to the bounding sphere and smallest-circle problem.

Education
Megiddo received his PhD in mathematics from the Hebrew University of Jerusalem for research supervised by Michael Maschler.

Career and research
In computational geometry, Megiddo is known for his prune and search and parametric search techniques both suggested in 1983 and used for various computational geometric optimization problems, in particular to solve the smallest-circle problem in linear time. His former doctoral students include Edith Cohen.

Awards and honours
Megiddo received the 2014 John von Neumann Theory Prize, the 1992 ICS Prize, and is a 1992 Frederick W. Lanchester Prize recipient. In 2009 he received the Institute for Operations Research and the Management Sciences (INFORMS) Fellows award for contributions to the theory and application of mathematical programming, including parametric searches, interior point methods, low dimension Linear Programming, probabilistic analysis of the simplex method and computational game theory.

References

Year of birth missing (living people)
Living people
Researchers in geometric algorithms
Hebrew University of Jerusalem alumni
American computer scientists
American operations researchers
Israeli operations researchers
John von Neumann Theory Prize winners
Game theorists
Numerical analysts
Fellows of the Institute for Operations Research and the Management Sciences
Jewish systems scientists